Chiton squamosus is a species of chiton, a marine polyplacophoran mollusk in the family Chitonidae, the typical chitons.

Description
The seven valves are dull, ashen-gray with dull-brown, irregular, wide, longitudinal stripes. Girdle alternates pale stripes of grayish white and grayish green.

Distribution and habitat
Chiton squamosus is present in southeastern Florida and the West Indies. These chitons occur in rocky coasts, in the zones of sweeping of the waves, at a depth of 0 – 3 meters.

References

 Linnaeus, C. (1767) - Systema naturae sive regna tria naturae, secundum classes, ordines, genera, species, cum characteribus, differentiis, synonymis, locis. Laurentii Salvii, Holmiae. 12th ed. v. 1 (pt 2)

Chitonidae
Molluscs described in 1764
Taxa named by Carl Linnaeus